Marvel Premiere Classic was a line of hardcover comic book collections, collecting Marvel Comics storylines in a standardized reprint format. 107 volumes were released, beginning in 2006. Each edition featured two covers: a standard cover; and a numbered "variant" cover for the comic book direct market, published in limited numbers and sporting a matching trade dress design (the edition was indicated on the back cover on the dust jacket). These books were similar to the Marvel Omnibus line.

DC Comics' equivalent line of hardcover comic book collections, the DC Comics Classics Library, was launched later in 2009.

The line was cancelled in August 2013 with the 106th volume.

A 107th volume was announced in February 2013, but no further volumes were published after that.

Collections

References

Marvel Comics lines